Michael Kent Young (born November 4, 1949) is an American lawyer and academic administrator. He previously served as president of Texas A&M University from 2015 to 2020, president of the University of Washington from 2011 to 2015, president of the University of Utah from 2004 to 2011, and dean of the George Washington University Law School from 1998 to 2004.

Early life and education 
Young was born and raised in Sacramento, California. He received a Bachelor of Arts with majors in political science and Japanese from Brigham Young University in 1973 and a Juris Doctor from Harvard Law School in 1976.

Career 
After law school, his judicial clerkships, and positions at two law firms, Young joined the United States State Department and served as Deputy Legal Adviser, Deputy Under Secretary for Economic and Agricultural Affairs, and Ambassador for Trade and Environmental Affairs in the Bush administration. Among many other international agreements, Young worked on treaties related to German unification, as well as the North American Free Trade Agreement (NAFTA) and Uruguay Round negotiations leading to the World Trade Organization and Earth Summit. 

Following his State Department work, Young became a professor and administrator at Columbia University from 1994 to 1998 and George Washington University from 1998 to 2004. His academic positions there included Fuyo Professor of Japanese Law and Legal Institutions and Director of the Center for Japanese Legal Studies at Columbia, and Dean and Lobingier Professor of Comparative Law and Jurisprudence at GWU's law school. 

Young was president of the University of Utah from August 2004 to May 2011. From 2011 to 2015, Young was the president of the University of Washington. He became president of Texas A&M University in May 2015.

Young also served on the United States Commission on International Religious Freedom from 1998 to 2005, including twice serving as its chair.

He is a member of the Council on Foreign Relations and a fellow of the American Bar Foundation.

Young announced his intention to retire from the presidency of Texas A&M University on September 2, 2020 to be effective in May 2021. In November, it was announced the resignation would take effect earlier on December 31, 2020.

Personal life 
He served as president of the New York Stake of the Church of Jesus Christ of Latter-day Saints from 1985 to 1989. 

Young married fellow BYU alumna Suzan Stewart and they are the parents of three children. They divorced in 2010.  

On June 3, 2011, he married Marti Denkers (Young). Young's relationship with Denkers was the subject of some controversy: Denkers was a student at the University of Utah during the time Young presided over it, and she was formerly married to Steve Denkers, a member of the wealthy Eccles family that has given hundreds of millions of dollars to the University of Utah over the years.

Honours 
  Royal House of Portugal: Knight of the Order of Saint Michael of the Wing (2007)

See also 
 List of law clerks of the Supreme Court of the United States (Seat 9)

References

External links 

Michael K. Young CV 

Presidents of Texas A&M University
Presidents of the University of Washington
Presidents of the University of Utah
Columbia University faculty
George Washington University faculty
Harvard Law School alumni
Brigham Young University alumni
American leaders of the Church of Jesus Christ of Latter-day Saints
American Mormon missionaries in Japan
Law clerks of the Supreme Court of the United States
Living people
Latter Day Saints from Texas
1949 births
Latter Day Saints from Utah
Latter Day Saints from Massachusetts
Latter Day Saints from New York (state)
Latter Day Saints from Washington, D.C.
Latter Day Saints from Washington (state)